Ol 55 may refer to:

 1955 Oldsmobile 
 "Ol' '55" - A 1973 song by Tom Waits, covered by the Eagles
 Ol' 55 (band) - An Australian rock band